The 1858 Philadelphia mayoral election saw the election of Alexander Henry.

Results

References

1858
Philadelphia
Philadelphia mayoral
19th century in Philadelphia